First Meeting may refer to:

 First Meeting (Miroslav Vitouš album)
 First Meeting (Tethered Moon album)
 First Meeting: Live in London, Volume 1, an album by Lee Konitz

See also
 First Meetings, a 2002 collection of science fiction short stories by American writer Orson Scott Card